Cape Zhelaniya (being Russian for 'wish/desire') is a headland in the Russian Federation. It is an important geographical landmark. The area in the vicinity of the cape is a desolate place, exposed to bitter Arctic winters. The cape along with the surrounding part of Novaya Zemlya is protected as part of Russian Arctic National Park.

Geography
Cape Zhelaniya is located at the northern end of Severny Island, the northern island of Novaya Zemlya. This headland is a geographic point of reference to mark the separation between the northern ends of the Barents Sea and the Kara Sea.

It belongs administratively to the Arkhangelsk Oblast of the Russian Federation.

History

There was a Soviet Arctic station in Cape Zhelaniya in World War II which was shelled by the Kriegsmarine during Operation Wunderland.

It became a secret experimental station during the Cold War while a multitude of nuclear tests, including 88 atmospheric ones, were conducted in Novaya Zemlya. It functioned as a weather station until 1994, and since 2005 there has been an automatic meteorological station located here.

Climate

References

Literature
 F. Romanenko, O. Shilovtseva, Russian-Soviet polar stations and their role in the Arctic Seas exploration.
 History of the Northern Sea Route
 Geology

Zhelaniya
Novaya Zemlya
Populated places of Arctic Russia
Zhelaniya